Hockaday is a surname. Notable people with the surname include:

Arthur Hockaday (1926–2004), English civil servant
Dave Hockaday (born 1957), English footballer and manager
Jim Hockaday (born 1964), American football player
Mary Hockaday (born 1962), British journalist